Bad Guys Always Die is a 2015 suspense crime action comedy film directed by Sun Hao. A China-South Korean co-production, the film was released in China on November 27, 2015 and in South Korea on January 7, 2016.

Plot
Qingzi, a Chinese language teacher at an elementary school in Busan, and his younger brother and two friends, while on a tour of Jeju island, came across what looks like a car accident with an injured Korean woman, Ji-yeon, at the driver's seat. When they try to bring her to the hospital, they end up trapping in the events of a murder and a kidnapping.

Cast
Chen Bolin - Qiangzi
Son Ye-jin - Ji-yeon
Qiao Zhenyu - San'er
Shin Hyun-joon - killer
Jang Gwang - Local station police-in-charge
Yang Xuwen - Pa-pa
Ding Wenbo - Datou
Park Chul-min - Catholic priest
Guan Xiaotong - a Chinese girl with San-er
Wi Ha-joon - Cha Myung-ho

Reception
The film grossed  on its opening weekend at the Chinese box office.

References

External links

2015 action comedy films
2010s crime comedy films
China Film Group Corporation films
Chinese action comedy films
Chinese crime comedy films
Huayi Brothers films
2010s Mandarin-language films
South Korean multilingual films
South Korean action comedy films
South Korean crime comedy films
Chinese multilingual films
2015 multilingual films
2015 crime action films
2010s South Korean films